The Estonian Sovereignty Declaration, fully: Declaration on the Sovereignty of the Estonian SSR, was issued on November 16, 1988 during the Singing Revolution in the Estonian SSR. The declaration asserted Estonia's sovereignty and the supremacy of the Estonian laws over the laws of the Soviet Union. Estonia's parliament also laid claim to the republic's natural resources: land, inland waters, forests, mineral deposits and to the means of industrial production, agriculture, construction, state banks, transportation, municipal services, etc. in the territory of Estonia's borders. November 16 is now celebrated annually as the "Day of Declaration of Sovereignty".

Background
Estonia gained independence in 1918, in the aftermath of World War I. During World War II, on 16-17 June 1940, Estonia was invaded and occupied by the Soviet Army, and its territory was subsequently annexed by the Stalinist Soviet Union in August 1940.

The majority of Western nations refused to recognize the incorporation of Estonia de jure by the Soviet Union and only recognized the government of the Estonian SSR de facto or not at all. Such countries recognized Estonian, Latvian and Lithuanian diplomats and consuls who still functioned in the name of their former governments. These diplomats persisted in this anomalous situation until the ultimate restoration of Baltic independence.

In the 1980s new policies of Perestroika and Glasnost were introduced and political repression in the Soviet Union came to an end. As a result, during the 1991 Soviet coup d'état attempt a 20 August 1991 declaration proclaimed the reestablishment of the independent Estonian republic almost three years after the declaration was made, becoming the last of the Baltic republics to declare the reestablishment of independence (after Lithuania and Latvia in 1990). On September 6, 1991, the Soviet Union recognized the independence of Estonia and the country was admitted to the UN on September 17.

After more than three years of negotiations, on August 31, 1994, the armed forces of Russia withdrew from Estonia. The Russian Federation officially ended its military presence in Estonia after it relinquished control of the nuclear reactor facilities in Paldiski in September 1995. Estonia joined the European Union in May 2004, shortly after it became a member of NATO, and later joined the Organisation for Economic Co-operation and Development in 2010.

The Declaration

See also
 On the Restoration of Independence of the Republic of Latvia
 Act of the Re-Establishment of the State of Lithuania
 State continuity of the Baltic states
 Dissolution of the Soviet Union

References

Dissolution of the Soviet Union
1988 in the Soviet Union
Singing Revolution
Sovereignty
1988 in politics
1988 in Estonia
Politics of Estonia
November 1988 events in Europe
1988 documents